Ricardo Jorge Francisco Maia de Campos (born 14 July 1985 in Caldas da Rainha, Leiria District) is a Mozambican former professional footballer who played as a goalkeeper.

External links

1985 births
Living people
People from Caldas da Rainha
Mozambican people of Portuguese descent
Mozambican footballers
Portuguese footballers
Association football goalkeepers
Primeira Liga players
Liga Portugal 2 players
Segunda Divisão players
S.L. Benfica B players
Caldas S.C. players
O Elvas C.A.D. players
S.C. Olhanense players
Boavista F.C. players
S.C.U. Torreense players
C.F. União players
U.D. Leiria players
Portugal youth international footballers
Mozambique international footballers
Sportspeople from Leiria District